The 2009 Team Speedway Junior World Championship was the fifth annual FIM Team Under-21 World Championship competition since its introduction in 2005. The final took place on September 5, 2009, in Gorzów Wielkopolski, Poland. It was the second final held in Poland, but the first in Gorzów; in 2006, the final took place in Rybnik, where Poland beat Sweden, Denmark and Germany.

Format 
The final consisted of the host team and the defending champions Poland. The other finalists were determined in two qualifying rounds (semi-finals). In Abensberg, Germany on June 1 was Sweden (3rd place in 2008 Final), Australia (4th place), Great Britain and host team Germany. Five days later in Pardubice, will be Denmark (Runner-up in 2008 Final), host team Czech Republic and Finland. The Russian team withdrew and was replaced by a joint team of Croatian and Slovenian riders, known as "Adria".

Results 

Qualifying Round 1 was won by Sweden (45 points) and they beat host team Germany (40 pts), Australia (35 pts) and Great Britain (26 pts). The top scored rider was Darcy Ward from Australia (maximum 15 points) and British Tai Woffinden (15 points also, but in six heats). Qualifying Round 2 was won by host team Czech Republic (56 pts). To the final was qualify second Denmark (55 pts, more than Germany). Adria (Croatia and Slovenia) beat in run-off Finland (both 16 points).

The Final was won be host team and the defending champions Poland (57 points), who they beat Denmark (45 pts), Sweden (32 pts) and Czech Republic (15 pts). The top scored rider was Przemysław Pawlicki from Poland (maximum 15 points). It was fifth title for Poland team and second for Grzegorz Zengota, Maciej Janowski and Artur Mroczka.

Heat details

Semifinal 1 
1 June 2009 (14:00)
 Abensberg, Speedwaystadion Abensberg (Length: 398 m)
Referee:  Mick Bates
Jury President:  Jörgen L. Jensen

Semifinal 2 
6 June 2009 (18:00) was canceled and was restarted on 7 June
 Pardubice, Speedway track AMK Zlatá přilba Pardubice-Svítkov (Length: 391m)
Referee:  Christian Froschauer
Jury President:  Boris Kotnjek

Final 
5 September 2009 (17:00 UTC+2)
 Gorzów Wielkopolski, Edward Jancarz Stadium (Length: 329 m)
Referee:  Craig Ackroyd
Jury President:  Janos Nadasdi
As a team squads was declared was changed three riders:
 (4) injury in Danish league match on 28 August Dennis Andersson → Kim Nilsson
 (1) Patryk Dudek → Dawid Lampart
 (1) injury in a track practice Michael Hádek → Václav Milík

See also 
 2009 Speedway World Cup
 2009 Individual Speedway Junior World Championship

References 

2009
World Team Junior